Phyllocnistis ephimera is a moth of the family Gracillariidae. It is known from Queensland, Australia.

References

Phyllocnistis
Endemic fauna of Australia